"Rikki-Tikki-Tavi" is a short story in the 1894 anthology The Jungle Book by Rudyard Kipling about adventures of a valiant young Indian grey mongoose. It has often been anthologized and has been published several times as a short book. Book 5 of Panchatantra, an ancient Indian collection, includes the mongoose and snake story, an inspiration for the "Rikki-Tikki-Tavi" story.

Plot

A mongoose named Rikki-Tikki-Tavi (from his chattering vocalizations) becomes the pet of an English family residing in India after they save him from drowning. He becomes friendly with some of the other creatures inhabiting their garden and is warned of the cobras Nag and Nagaina, who are angered by the human family's presence in their territory and fear Rikki as a threat. That same day, a young dust brown snake named Karait threatens to bite the child of the family. This sight infuriates Rikki into challenging it unaware the smaller snake is as venomous as a cobra and faster. Despite the risk, Rikki emerges victorious and kills the snake, saving the child.

Later that night, Rikki hears Nag and Nagaina plot to kill the family to take over the house for their hatchlings and drive Rikki away. Nag enters the house's bathroom before dawn to make his ambush. Rikki, however, ambushes  Nag from behind in the darkness. The ensuing struggle awakens the family, and the father appears to have killed Nag with a shotgun blast while Rikki bites down on the hood of the struggling male cobra.

The following morning, a grieving Nagaina attempts revenge against the humans, cornering them as they have breakfast on a veranda. She is distracted by Darzee's wife tailor bird (Darzee is singing Nag's death), while Rikki destroys the cobra's unhatched brood of eggs, except for one. He carries it to where Nagaina is threatening to bite little Teddy, while his parents watch helplessly. Rikki furiously challenges her and lures the cobra away from the family.

Nagaina recovers her egg during the battle, but is pursued by Rikki away from the house to the cobra's underground nest, where an unseen final battle takes place. Rikki emerges triumphant from the hole, declaring Nagaina dead. With the immediate threat defeated, Rikki dedicates his life to guarding the garden, resulting in no snake even daring show its head in the garden's walls.

Adaptations
Director Alexandra Snezhko-Blotskaya shot an animated short film of this story titled Рикки-Тикки-Тави (Rikki-Tikki-Tavi) in 1965 in the Soviet Union, at the film studio Soyuzmultfilm. Ten years later, Chuck Jones adapted it for a half-hour television special in the United States, with Orson Welles narrating and providing the voice of Nag. The same year, Aleksandr Juridic and Nan Nashville directed a live-action feature film entitled Rikki-Tikki-Tavi.

In the anime television series, Jungle Book Shōnen Mowgli, Rikki-Tikki-Tavi is a supporting character who is the pet of an Indian family and is a heroic defender of them.

In the CGI series The Jungle Book, Rikki-Tikki-Tavi is an occasional character who is a friend of Mowgli.

References

External links

 The Jungle Book - “Rikki-Tikki-Tavi”
 
 

Fictional mongooses
The Jungle Book stories
1894 short stories
Short stories set in India
Literary characters introduced in 1894
Male characters in literature
Male characters in animation